Dichomeris pleurophaea is a moth in the family Gelechiidae. It was described by Turner in 1919. It is found in Australia, where it has been recorded from Queensland.

The forewings are pale ochreous-brown, with the costa dark-fuscous throughout, commencing as a broad line from the base, widening at one-fourth to a blotch extending half across the disc, narrowing to a point shortly before the apex. There is a minute fuscous dot on the fold in the middle, and another above the tornus, as well as a transverse ferruginous-brown line from the apex of the costal patch to the termen. The apex is suffused with ferruginous-brown. The hindwings are dark-grey.

References

Moths described in 1919
pleurophaea